Collonista is a genus of sea snails in the family Colloniidae.

Species
, the World Register of Marine Species accepts 20 species within the genus Collonista:
 Collonista amakusaensis 
 Collonista arsinoensis 
 Collonista costulosa 
 Collonista crassilirata 
 Collonista delecta 
 Collonista eroopolitana 
 Collonista glareosa 
 Collonista granulosa 
 Collonista hoatkoe 
 Collonista jucunda 
 Collonista kreipli 
 Collonista lenticula 
 Collonista miltochrista 
 Collonista picta 
 Collonista purpurata 
 Collonista rubricincta 
 Collonista solida 
 Collonista thachi 
 Collonista verruca  
 Collonista viridula

References

 Williams S.T., Karube S. & Ozawa T. (2008) Molecular systematics of Vetigastropoda: Trochidae, Turbinidae and Trochoidea redefined. Zoologica Scripta 37: 483–506.
 Huang S.-I, Fu I-F. & Poppe G.T. (2016). Taiwanese and Philippine Colloniidae. Nomenclatural remarks and the description of 17 new species (Gastropoda: Colloniidae). Visaya. 4(5): 4-42